The Glehn Castle (also Mustamäe Manor) is a castle on the hillside of Nõmme, part of Tallinn, Estonia.

History 

The manor was designed and established by Nikolai von Glehn on the northern part of the lands of his Jälgimäe Manor to become his new residence. The castle was completed in 1886. The castle is surrounded by a park with several buildings like a palm house (1900–1910), observatory tower (1910) and sculptures "Kalevipoeg" (1908), "Crocodile" (1908), all of which were also designed by Glehn himself.

After Glehn emigrated to Germany in 1918 the castle was looted and fell into decline. In the 1960s, restoration of the building commenced. The renovated palace was inaugurated on the 24 March 1977.

In popular culture 

The film The Hound of the Baskervilles was shot around the castle in 1981.

Gallery

See also
 List of palaces and manor houses in Estonia

References

External links

 Official page at the website of Tallinn University of Technology 
 Mustamäe Manor at Estonian Manors Portal

Castles in Estonia
Buildings and structures in Tallinn
Houses completed in 1886
Manor houses in Estonia
1880s establishments in Estonia
Kreis Harrien
1886 establishments in the Russian Empire